The Quequechan Club is a historic building at 306 North Main Street in Fall River, Massachusetts.

The building was built in 1861 and added to the National Register of Historic Places in 1983.

The Quequechan club was originally a gentlemen's club in the late 19th century that was run by all of the members. The bedrooms upstairs were used as a bed and breakfast. During the early 20th century the club turned more into a restaurant, and banquet hall for members. It was not until the 1970s that women were allowed to enter the dining room unescorted. The club is no longer member-operated and is owned by sole proprietor Dan Silva. The club remains private and allows members to smoke inside the pub. The Club has been reported to be haunted, and mediums and ghost hunters have visited the premises. Solid proof has yet to be found.

See also
National Register of Historic Places listings in Fall River, Massachusetts

References 

Cultural infrastructure completed in 1861
Clubhouses on the National Register of Historic Places in Massachusetts
Buildings and structures in Fall River, Massachusetts
National Register of Historic Places in Fall River, Massachusetts
1861 establishments in Massachusetts